This is a list of events in Ponce, Puerto Rico. Ponce is Puerto Rico's second largest city outside the San Juan metropolitan area. It is located in the southern coast of Puerto Rico, about a 75-minute drive via Autopista Las Americas or reachable via plane as a destination at the Mercedita International Airport or by cruise line at the Port of the Americas. Ponce holds numerous annual events. Only the most prominent and popular ones are listed below.

Ponce events list summary table
The following table lists recurring events in Ponce by their month of occurrence. A listing sorted by any of the other fields can be obtained by clicking on the header of the field. For example, clicking on "Year Established" will sort events by the year when the event started.

Key:
~ = Date is approximate

See also

 List of hotels in Ponce, Puerto Rico
 Nightlife in Ponce, Puerto Rico

References

External links

 Photos of Ponce:
 Photos of Ponce at Panoramio
 Photos of Ponce at Flick
 Photos of Ponce at Virtual Tourist
Tourism
 Information about Ponce's tourist attractions
  Centro Ceremonial Indígena de Tibes Video & Contact Info.
 Historic Places in Puerto Rico and the Virgin Islands, a National Park Service Discover Our Shared Heritage Travel Itinerary
 Management Plan for La Esperanza Nature Preserve in Ponce, Puerto Rico. Matthew Bourque, Drew Digeser, Stephen Partridge, and Hussein Yatim. Worcester Polytechnic Institute. Worcester, Massachusetts. 2 May 2012. Retrieved 4 August 2013.
 Ponce History
 Official Website of Municipality of Ponce. Ponce y su Importancia Historica
 29 December 2000 'Ponce en Marcha' Final Decision by the Puerto Rico Supreme Court (2000 DTS 194, MUNICIPIO DE PONCE V. AUTORIDAD DE CARRETERAS 2000TSPR194; Case Number: CC-98-241 Cons. CC-98-231, 250, 257, 258 and 259)
 29 December 2000 'Ponce en Marcha' Dissent Opinion from Associate P.R. Sup. Court Justice Honorable Efraín Rivera Pérez (page 1)
 29 December 2000 'Ponce en Marcha' Dissent Opinion from Associate P.R. Sup. Court Justice Honorable Efraín Rivera Pérez (page 2)
 Census:
 Ponce and its barrios, United States Census Bureau
 Others:
 Autonomous Municipality of Ponce official site

.
Ponce
events